Az-Zawaqir is a sub-district located in the At-Ta'iziyah District, Taiz Governorate, Yemen. Az-Zawaqir had a population of 8,258 according to the 2004 census.

Climate 
The highest average temperature in the district is in June, where it is 31°C. The coldest is January, when it is 23°C.

References  

Sub-districts in At-Ta'iziyah District